Temnora ntombi is a moth of the  family Sphingidae. It is found from Ivory Coast to Cameroon, the Republic of the Congo and Gabon.

Subspecies
Temnora ntombi ntombi
Temnora ntombi herlanti Haxaire, 1993 (Ivory Coast)

References

Temnora
Moths described in 1975
Insects of Cameroon
Fauna of the Republic of the Congo
Fauna of Gabon
Moths of Africa